The Rudolph H. Sitz Building is a historic building located in the West End of Davenport, Iowa, United States. Rudolph Sitz has this building built in 1913 to house his grocery store, which had been previously located at 2747 West Third Street. The building has subsequently been turned into a tavern. The two-story Mission Revival style structure features a curved, broken pediment, bracketed eaves on projecting eave sections, and an arch over the storefront. It is one of the few buildings in Davenport built in this style. It was listed on the National Register of Historic Places in 1983.

References

Commercial buildings completed in 1913
Mission Revival architecture in Iowa
Spanish Revival architecture in Iowa
Buildings and structures in Davenport, Iowa
Commercial buildings on the National Register of Historic Places in Iowa
National Register of Historic Places in Davenport, Iowa
1913 establishments in Iowa